Andrea N. Parker  is an American film and television actress. She is known for her roles on ER, The Pretender, Less than Perfect, Desperate Housewives, and Pretty Little Liars.

Career
Her first documented film role was at age 19 in the movie Rented Lips in which she played a dancer/nurse.  Parker appeared in Married... with Children as a Go-Go Dancer in 2 episodes – "Prom Queen: The Sequel" (1989) and "Prom Queen: Part 1" (1989).

After The Pretender was cancelled by NBC in 2000, Parker did another guest spot on JAG before signing on to reprise her role as Miss Parker in the telemovies for The Pretender, which aired on TNT in 2001. She then returned to series television in 2002 and starred in the ABC comedy Less than Perfect, playing Lydia Weston until it was cancelled in 2006. From 2011 to 2012, Parker had recurring role of Jane Carlson in the ABC series Desperate Housewives. She later starred in NBC drama pilot Beautiful People, and joined the cast of ABC Family series Pretty Little Liars.

Personal life
Parker supports various charities such as the National Hospice Palliative Care Organization, Glenn Siegel's My Good Friend charity organization, The Michael J. Fox Foundation for Parkinson's research and Project Angel Food. In February 2006, Parker attended a benefit with former Pretender co-stars Michael T. Weiss and James Denton for Cure Autism Now.

Filmography

Film

Television

Awards and nominations

References

External links
 
 

20th-century American actresses
21st-century American actresses
American film actresses
American television actresses
Living people
Place of birth missing (living people)
Year of birth missing (living people)